William Stuart may refer to:

Politics
 Lord William Stuart (1778–1814), naval commander, MP for Cardiff (1802–14); nephew of William Stuart (1755–1822)
 William Stuart (1798–1874), Tory MP for Armagh City 1820–1826, Bedfordshire (1830–31; 1832–35); son of William Stuart (1755–1822)
 William Stuart (1824–1896), British diplomat, Minister to Argentina, Greece, and The Netherlands
 William Stuart (1825–1893), Conservative MP for Bedford (1854–57 and 1859–68); son of William Stuart (1798–1874)
 William Horwood Stuart (1857–1906), British diplomat and vice-consul; assassinated in Batum, Georgia
 William Z. Stuart (1811–1876), Justice of the Indiana Supreme Court

Sports
 Bill Stuart (1873–1928), American Major League Baseball player
 Hod Stuart (William Hodgson Stuart, 1879–1907), Canadian ice hockey player
 Billy Stuart (William Roxborough Stuart, 1900–1978), Canadian ice hockey player
 William Stuart (cricketer) (1871–1956), Australian cricketer
 William Stuart (footballer) (1890–?), English footballer
 Bill Stuart (rugby league), New Zealand rugby league player

Other
 William Stuart (bishop) (1755–1822), Bishop of St David's in Wales and later Archbishop of Armagh in Ireland
 William Stuart (British Army officer) (1778–1837), British Army officer, Lieutenant Colonel of the Guards wounded at Waterloo
 William James Stuart (British Army officer) (1831-1914), British Army officer, Colonel Commandant of the Royal Engineers
 William Corwin Stuart (1920–2010), American federal judge
 William James Stuart (1873–1958), Scottish surgeon

See also
William Stewart (disambiguation)
William Steuart (disambiguation)